is a Japanese media franchise created by Takara Tomy and TBS. It consists of two manga series, both published by Shogakukan from 2016 to 2017, and a 47-episode anime television series by TMS Entertainment, aired from April 2016 to March 2017.

Story
In a world where every event was computer programs, mysterious monsters known as "Promin" maintain the world. However, many Promins have corrupted into bugs known as "Bugmin" like real-life viruses and bugs. Left alone, they may eventually turn into a big problem. The boy Yuuto, with Wanda, and the pair use a camera-like device and essential items to capture Bugmin. Promin themselves can do things like "accelerate," "spew fire," or "create," through an ability known as "Kamiwaza" (miracle), and can fend off Bugmin with it. At first, the Bugmin only cause little, bothersome things, but it will soon elevate into a global scale threat. Can one boy and one dog save the world?

Characters

Main characters

Yuuto is a young boy and the son of a couple who works on Kirakira First Street at a hobby store called Hobby Kamiya. Yuuto first met Wanda when he went on a search for his sister Yui. He later became a Kamiwaza Power-Shooter the very next day after repairing the Kamiwaza Power-Shot. Bug-Tonkmin was the first Bugmin Yuuto had captured and debugged himself. In the manga, Bug-Turbomin was the first Bugmin Yuuto had captured and debugged instead. He likes to repair things.

Wanda is the white dog-like prince from the Wonder-Star planet, who was once an heir to the throne of his father. the king Wanda. In the anime, he was sent to Earth after his home planet was entirely frozen. He then met Yuuto and became his Kamiwaza teammate. Wanda sniffs out for any signs of a Bugmin and then if there is one, he uses his Kamiwaza Searcher to make the Bugmin leak. After Don Bugdez was defeated and his home planet was thawed, Wanda decided to return to Earth rather than stay with Nice, Amazing, and Mighty.

Mirai is one of Yuuto's friends. She is the daughter of a married couple who works on Kirakira First Street at a flower shop. Later on, Mirai became a Kamiwaza Power-Shooter after her Kamiwaza teammate Amazing arrived on Earth. Bug-Hasamin was the first Bugmin Mirai had captured and debugged. However, Mirai did not become a Kamiwaza Power-Shooter in the manga series.

Amazing is Mirai's Kamiwaza teammate and one of Wanda's friends.

Shuu is one of Yuuto's friends. He is the son of a couple who works at a tempura shop that serves fried foods at Kirakira First Street, especially Wanda's favorite food, chicken karaage. He is a clever young boy. Shuu became a Kamiwaza Power-Shooter after his Kamiwaza teammate Nice arrived on Earth. Bug-Kyatchimin was the first Bugmin Shuu had captured and debugged. However, Shuu did not become a Kamiwaza Power-Shooter in the manga series.

Nice is Shuu's Kamiwaza teammate and one of Wanda's friends.

Masato is the rival of Yuuto. Prior to his debut in the series, Masato became a Kamiwaza Power-Shooter when he first met his Kamiwaza teammate Mighty in the rain outside Kirakira Hospital. He became the second Kamiwaza Power-Shooter to awaken a Fact-Promin, when he awakened Metmin. After he failed to confront Don Bugdez on his own, Masato decided to become friends with Yuuto.

Mighty is Masato's Kamiwaza teammate and Wanda's long lost friend. Prior to his debut, Mighty left for Earth after finding his home planet completely frozen. After Masato failed to confront Don Bugdez on his own Mighty ran away, leaving Masato behind. Later, Mighty decides to help Yuuto, Mirai, and Shuu get rid of Don Bugdez with their Kamiwaza teammates Wanda, Nice, and Amazing by using the Fact-Promins and restoring the Wonder-Star using Wonder-Promin.

Antagonists

Don Bugdez is a huge evil spirit who serves him as their master with Great. He is the arch-nemesis of King Wanda. He is responsible for the spell that cursed the Wonder-Star, making it prone to be invaded by Bugmins, and his goal is to see the Earth's corruption evolve into its ultimate level. He becomes furious after seeing all the remaining Bugmins (except for Bug-Gauzemin) being captured and debugged by Yuuto and his three friends, turning himself into his monstrous form, and trying to evolve the Earth's corruption to its ultimate level all by himself. However, he was finally confronted by Wonder-Promin. Don Bugdez's is later defeated with the blasts from the Fact-Promins.

Great is the dog-like mad scientist from Wanda Planet. He disappears after Don Bugdez had confronted by Wonder-Promin when he was in monstrous form.

The Bug Bytes
 is a group of "hackers" who serve their master Don Bugdez.

Terara is a red member of The Bug Bytes who came from a barbie doll. Terara is a Wazawai Program Holder because she has the Wazawai Program which turns whatever Promin it touches into a Bugmin.

Megaga is a green member of The Bug Bytes who came from a Stretch Armstrong toy. He can stretch his body.

Gigaga is the blue member of the Bug Bytes who came from a wrestler figure toy.

Supporting characters

Yui is Yuuto's younger sister. She has a crush on Wanda, who she mistook for her family's pet dog, Wannosuke. Yui likes to do drawing with her crayons.

Souma is one of Yuuto's friends. He is a director of Nicole's podcasts at Kirakira Radio Station. He lives in a mansion with his servants. It is later revealed that his servants, including butler Tora Imauma, have been working for Souma ever since his parents died in a plane crash.

Nicole is one of Yuuto's friends. She is the daughter of a sea captain and his wife. She hosts her podcasts at Kirakira Radio Station.

Media

Manga
A manga series, illustrated by Chihiro Gogitsune, was serialized in Shogakukan's children's manga magazine Corocoro Ichiban from March 19, 2016, to March 21, 2017. Shogakukan collected its chapters in three tankōbon volumes, released from July 28, 2016, to April 28, 2017.

A 4-koma spin-off manga series, titled , illustrated by Maeda-Kun, was serialized in Corocoro Comic Special from February 29 to December 29, 2016.

Volume list

Anime
An anime television series, animated by TMS Entertainment, was announced in January 2016. The series was broadcast on TBS from April 23, 2016, to March 23, 2017.

Episode list

Video game
A video game for the Nintendo 3DS by FuRyu, titled , was released on October 27, 2016.

Notes

References

External links
 

Children's manga
Mass media franchises introduced in 2016
Shogakukan franchises
Shogakukan manga
TBS Television (Japan) original programming
TMS Entertainment
Takara Tomy franchises